Porus may refer to:
King Porus, an ancient Indian ruler who fought against Alexander the Great
Porus the Younger, an Indian ruler, the nephew of the above Porus
Porus (Attica), a deme of ancient Attica
Porus (mythology), either of two related mythological figures in Greek classical literature or a third in Roman mythology
Porus (TV series), Indian TV series based on Porus and Alexander the Great
Porus, Jamaica, a village in Manchester, Jamaica
Halpe porus, a butterfly belonging to the family Hesperiidae
Dabasa porus, a butterfly belonging to the family Papilionidae
Porus acusticus internus, the opening of the canal in the skull that carries nerves from inside the cranium towards the middle and inner ear compartments
The Porus Islands in the Pemadumcook Chain of Lakes
Tan Porus, a character in the Isaac Asimov short story Homo Sol
Strator Porus, an agent of the New Canaanites, a despotic regime from the X-Men comic series
Porus F.C., a football club on the list of football clubs in Jamaica
Professor Porus Vesuna, head of the Department of Psychiatry at Baroda Medical College
Typhlodromus porus, a mite on the list of Phytoseiidae species

See also
Poros (disambiguation)